Minamiyama (written: 南山 lit. "south mountain") is a Japanese surname. Notable people with the surname include:

, Japanese women's footballer
, Japanese basketball player

See also
南山 (disambiguation)

Japanese-language surnames